The New York City Landmarks Preservation Commission (LPC), formed in 1965, is the New York City governmental commission that administers the city's Landmarks Preservation Law. Since its founding, it has designated over a thousand landmarks, classified into four categories: individual landmarks, interior landmarks, scenic landmarks, and historic districts.

The New York City borough of Staten Island contains numerous landmarks designated by the LPC, several interior landmarks and historic districts. The following is an incomplete list. Some of these are also National Historic Landmark (NHL) sites, and NHL status is noted where known.

source: ; ; date listed is date of designation;

Historic districts

Individual landmarks

1-9

A-M

N-Z

Interior Landmarks

See also 
 List of New York City Landmarks
 List of New York State Historic Markers in Richmond County, New York

Notes

References

Locally designated landmarks in the United States
 
Landmarks
Staten Island
New York City Landmarks Preservation Commission
Staten island